Nokaut! (trans. Knockout) is the second and the laste studio album by Yugoslav rock band Zlatni Prsti, released in 1979.  Soon after the album was released, the band decided to adopt Nokaut as their new name.

Track listing

Personnel
 Momčilo Radenković – vocals, guitar
 Dušan Maslać – keyboards
 Jovan Nikolić – bass
 Dragan Trajković – drums, percussion

Additional personnel
 Ljubomir Sedlar – producer
 Slobodan Purić – photography
 Zoran Tišma – photography

References

 
 Nokaut! at Rate Your Music

External links
 

Zlatni Prsti albums
PGP-RTB albums
1979 albums